Almenara, also popularly known by the name of La Ventilla, is an administrative neighborhood of Madrid located in the district of Tetuán. The Avenida de Asturias crosses the area.

References
Informational notes

Citations

Wards of Madrid
Tetuán (Madrid)